Bright Ambush is  a book of poems written by Audrey Wurdemann  in 1934. In May 1935 Wurdemann won the Pulitzer Prize for Poetry for the book. She was the youngest person to win the prize for poetry.

References

External links
Bright Ambush, Google books

1934 poetry books
American poetry collections 
Pulitzer Prize for Poetry-winning works